Brendola is a town and comune in the province of Vicenza, Veneto, northern Italy. It is south of A4 motorway.

One of the landmarks is the church of Madonna dei Prati. Another is the Oratory of Santa Maria Annunciata a Caasa Revese, a free-standing, Renaissance style chapel.

Cities and towns in Veneto